Camp Albuquerque was an American World War II POW camp in Albuquerque, New Mexico that housed Italian and German prisoners of war. From this branch camp, the POWs did mostly farm labor, from 1943 to 1946. Most of these POWs were transferred from Camp Roswell, which was a base or main POW camp for New Mexico. Camp Lordsburg, New Mexico, and Camp El Paso, Texas, were also base camps.

History
Prisoners were transferred to Camp Albuquerque because it was closer to their work sites. These main and branch camps were part of a POW camp system spread across much of the United States. At its World War II peak, almost 426,000 prisoners - 371,683 German, 50,273 Italian, and 3,915 Japanese - were held in the United States. Beginning with 1,881 POWs in the United States at the end of 1942, was up to 172,879 by the end of 1943, and peaked at 425,871 on V-E Day.

From October 1943 Italian POWs were housed in Rio Grande Park in former Civilian Conservation Corps (CCC) barracks that had been built in the 1930s. The site was located north of the present day Rio Grande Zoo, founded in 1927. The Italian POWs all left six months later.

From 25 July 1944 until March 1946 German POWs, most of them captured in the North Africa campaigns, were housed in these same barracks buildings. The barracks had been moved to South 2nd Street and onto  at the north end of the Schwartzman property, and made ready for their arrival.

Shifting prisoner populations and transfers were routine. This was done to remove pro-Nazi troublemakers, and to help break up escape attempts and their all tunnel digging teams. Still, three Germans did escape from Camp Albuquerque, but two were soon recaptured.

At peak occupancy, sometime in 1945, there were 171 German POWs in branch Camp Albuquerque. They worked on the various farms from Los Lunas to Corrales, helping in particular with the harvest in the fall.

See also
List of POW camps
List of POW camps in Britain
List of POW camps in Canada
List of POW camps in the United States

External links
http://www.abqjournal.com/venue/travel/tourism/taste/355446metro05-29-05.htm
http://www.abqjournal.com/venue/travel/tourism/taste/355448metro05-29-05.htm
https://web.archive.org/web/20050426183950/http://archives.nmsu.edu/rghc/index/pow/hanna.html
"German and Italian detainees," Alan Rosenfeld, Densho Encyclopedia

Further reading
Billinger, Robert D. Hitler's Soldiers in the Sunshine State: German Pows in Florida. 2000. 
Cowley, Betty. Stalag Wisconsin: Inside WW II Prisoner of War Camps. 2002. 
Fiedler, David Winston. The Enemy Among Us: POWs in Missouri During World War II. 2003 
Gaertner, Georg. Hitler's Last Soldier in America. 1985.
Kiefer, Louis E. Italian Prisoners of War in America, 1942-1946: Captives or Allies? 1992.
Koop, Allen V. Stark Decency: German Prisoners of War in a New England Village. 1988.
Krammer, Arnold. Nazi Prisoners of War in America. 1996.
Lewis, George C. and John Mewha. History of Prisoner of War Utilization by the United States Army, 1776-1945. 1955.
Moore, John Hammond. The Faustball Tunnel: German POWs in America and Their Great Escape. 1978.
Spidle, Jake W., Jr. "Axis Invasion of the American West: POWs in New Mexico, 1942-1946". New Mexico Historical Review' (April 1974).
Waters, Michael R. Lone Star Stalag: German Prisoners of War at Camp Hearne''. 2004.

History of Albuquerque, New Mexico
Civilian Conservation Corps in New Mexico
World War II prisoner of war camps in the United States
Military installations in New Mexico
Civilian Conservation Corps camps
1943 establishments in New Mexico
1946 disestablishments in New Mexico